Martyna Grajber (born 28 March 1995) is a Polish volleyball player. She plays for Budowlani Łódź in the Polish Orlen Liga.

She was part of the Polish squad that competed at the 2016 FIVB Volleyball World Grand Prix.

Awards

Individual
 2019 Montreux Volley Masters "Best Outside Spiker"

References

Living people
1995 births
Polish women's volleyball players
People from Piła
Sportspeople from Greater Poland Voivodeship